Herbert Max Finlay Freundlich  (28 January 1880 in Charlottenburg – 30 March 1941 in Minneapolis) was a German chemist.

His father was of German Jewish descent, and his mother ( Finlay) was from Scotland. His younger brother was Erwin Finlay Freundlich (1885–1964).

He was a department head at the Kaiser Wilhelm Institute for Physical Chemistry and Electrochemistry (now the Fritz Haber Institute) from 1919 until 1933, when the racial policies of the Nazi party demanded the dismissal of non-Aryans from senior posts. In 1934 he became a foreign member of the Royal Netherlands Academy of Arts and Sciences.

Emigrating to England, Freundlich accepted a guest professorship at University College London. Five years later, he accepted a professorship at the University of Minnesota. He died in Minneapolis two years later.

Freundlich's main works dealt with the coagulation and stability of colloidal solutions.

His most prominent student was Robert Havemann who became a well known colloid chemist of the German Democratic Republic.

His work is of continuing importance, with his 1907 paper "Über die Adsorption in Lösungen"  (On adsorption in solutions) becoming highly cited at the beginning of the 21st century. This early paper was based on his habilitation thesis written in Leipzig under the guidance of Wilhelm Ostwald, and was heavily based on the work of Sten Lagergren.

See also 
 Freundlich equation
 Ostwald–Freundlich equation
 Thixotropy

References

External links
 
 Herbert Freundlich - Did you know that the man of science Herbert Freudlich was also a composer?
  Ausstellungstafel der TU Berlin zu Prof. Freundlich
  Otto Hahns Rolle als Interimsdirektor des KWI für Physikalische Chemie und Elektrochemie 1933. Ein Vorabdruck aus dem Forschungsprogramm „Geschichte der Kaiser-Wilhelm-Gesellschaft im Nationalsozialismus"

1880 births
1941 deaths
German physical chemists
20th-century American chemists
Academic staff of the Technical University of Braunschweig
Jewish emigrants from Nazi Germany to the United States
Foreign Members of the Royal Society
Academic staff of the Humboldt University of Berlin
Academic staff of the Technical University of Berlin
Members of the Royal Netherlands Academy of Arts and Sciences
Colloid chemists
Max Planck Institute directors